Metis or Métis may refer to:

Ethnic groups
 Métis, recognized Indigenous communities in Canada and America whose distinct culture and language emerged after early intermarriage between First Nations peoples and early European settlers, primarily French fur trappers
 Métis in Canada are a recognized Indigenous nation, descended from specific First Nations peoples and early European settlers, and who trace their lineage to the Métis Homeland. Métis people are a nation with distinct cultural practices and language.
 Métis in the United States are also a specific cultural community, with a recognized culture, lineage and homeland, and not just any "mixed" people

Organizations in Canada
Organizations with "Metis" or "Métis" in their names. May or may not have the same criteria for membership
 Métis National Council
 Métis Nation British Columbia
 Métis Nation of Alberta
 Métis Nation-Saskatchewan

Other
 Manitoba Métis Federation
 Métis Nation of Ontario
 North Slave Métis Alliance, Northwest Territories
 Vancouver Métis Community Association

Places
 Grand-Métis, Quebec, Canada
 Métis-sur-Mer, Quebec, Canada
 Saint-Paul-des-Métis, now St. Paul, Alberta, Canada
 Metis Shoal, the tip of a submarine volcano in Tonga
 Metiş, a village in Mihăileni, Sibiu, Romania
 Metis Island in Antarctica

Other uses
 9 Metis, an asteroid
 9K115 Metis, a Russian anti–tank missile system
 9K115-2 Metis-M, a Russian anti–tank missile system
 Metis (American musician) (fl. 21st century), American rapper
 Metis (theorem prover), an automated theorem prover
 Metis (Japanese musician) (born 1984), Japanese reggae singer
 Metis (moon), the innermost of Jupiter's known moons
 Metis (mythology), a Titaness and the first wife of Zeus
 Metis (software), business modeling software
 METIS, a software package for graph partitioning
 Metis TransPacific Airlines, a Canadian airline based in Vancouver
 Metis (holothurian), a synonym for a genus of sea cucumbers, Actinopyga
 Metis (Character), a playable character from Persona 3 FES

See also

 Metisse, windowing software
 Metius, Dutch geometer
 Metius (crater), a lunar impact crater
 
 Meti (disambiguation)